School District 38 can refer to:

Canada
 Richmond School District or District #38 (British Columbia)

United States
Big Hollow School District 38 (Illinois)
Bigfork School District 38 (Montana)
Fremont County School District 38 (Wyoming)
Lewis Palmer School District 38 (Colorado)
Kenilworth District No. 38 (Illinois)